Bill Haley (1925-1981) was a pioneering American rock and roll musician.

Bill Haley may also refer to:

 Bill Haley (Texas politician) (born 1943), Texan legislator
 Bill Haley (Wyoming politician), Wyoming legislator
 Bill Haley (footballer), English association football midfielder

Not to be confused with Bill Halley (born William H. Heagney, 1882–1955), an American songwriter of the early 20th century.